The siege of Aintab was a military engagement between the Turkish National Forces and the French Army of the Levant occupying the city of Aintab (present-day Gaziantep) during the Turkish War of Independence (specifically its southern front, known as the Franco-Turkish War).

Fighting began in April 1920, when French forces opened fire on the city. It ended with the Kemalist defeat and the city's surrender to the French military forces on 9 February 1921. However, despite a victory, the French ultimately decided to retreat from the city leaving it to Kemalist forces on 20 October 1921 in accordance with the Treaty of Ankara. According to Ümit Kurt, born in modern-day Gaziantep and an academic at Harvard’s Center for Middle East Studies, the resistance movement not just sought to regain the control of the city but also aimed at keeping the loots from the local Armenians and eradicating the Armenian community of the city.

Timeline

1920
 1 - 16 April: 1st Turkish siege
 30 April - 23 May: 2nd Turkish siege
 30 May - 18 June: 1920 armistice
 29 July - 10 August: 3rd Turkish siege
 11 August:  beginning of French siege
 21 November - 18 December: Goubeau column participation

1921
 7 February: last exit attempt
 8 February: sending of a city parliamentary mission - cease fire
 9 February: capitulation

Notes

References

Further reading
Shepard, Dr. Lorin, "Fighting the Turks at Aintab," Current History 14/4 (July 1921).

Battles of the Franco-Turkish War
Siege of antep
Siege of Antep
1920 in France
1921 in France
1920 in the Ottoman Empire
1921 in the Ottoman Empire
Aleppo vilayet
History of Gaziantep
Sieges of the Industrial era
Sieges involving France
Sieges involving the Ottoman Empire